Karachi Grammar School is an independent, English-medium school located in 3 different campuses across Karachi. The main and oldest campus is located in Saddar, Karachi, Sindh, Pakistan. It is a highly selective, coeducational day school (formerly day/boarding school) serving approximately 2,400 students aged between three and nineteen years.

Established in 1847 by the Reverend Henry Brereton, the first chaplain of Karachi, as a school for "English and Anglo-Indo children", it is the oldest private school in Pakistan and the second oldest in South Asia, a member of the Winchester International Symposium and a former member of the Headmaster's Conference.

Since the 1980s, Karachi Grammar School has expanded from a school with a population of a few hundred students to a large institution that now occupies three sites and teaches more than two thousand students.

History

1847–1854: Origins 
Karachi Grammar School was founded as the Anglo-Indian School in 1847. It remained the only non-native school in the town until St Patrick's High School, Karachi was founded in 1861, followed by St. Joseph's Convent School, Karachi in 1862 and Manora School in 1866. Reverend Henry Brereton, the First Chaplain of Karachi, established the school and provided the early accommodation for the school at his private residence, with the first classes taking place in his kitchen. The class formed by the Chaplain was at first small enough to be accommodated in this modest premises, however the smooth running of this school over the next seven years was disturbed by rumours of Brereton not being a "good master" and his performance as a manager unsatisfactory.

Looking into this matter, on 27 July 1854, the Commissioner of Sindh, Sir Bartle Frere, summoned a public meeting with a view to establishing an institution that provided 'good secular instruction to children of all sects'. In this meeting funds were collected through subscriptions to establish a school, a managing committee was appointed and rules were framed that later became the basis for the present Constitution of KGS. It was the newly appointed managing committee that decided to purchase the Mess House of Her Majesty's 64th Regiment at No. 24 Depot Lines, which is at the site of the present day Middle School. The reorganized school was formally opened on 1 November 1854 as "The Kurrachee European and Indo-European School".

1854–1914: Early years 
The school continued on its regular course with a small student body of around 40 children. In 1874, Reverend G. B. Streeton, then Chaplain of Karachi and Honorary Secretary of the school suggested a plan that included expanding the school premises and securing a title deed for the land the school was to occupy, which could only be completed by August 1890 due to complications regarding the government's rights to the resumption of cantonment land.

Streeton raised ₨ 4,918, which enabled his plan to go ahead. Captain Thomas F. Dowden of the Royal Bombay Engineers was commissioned to make the architectural drawings for the new building. The new school building was opened for boarders on 27 February 1875 by Sir William Merewether, Commissioner-in-Sind at that time. The role of children was 75 in 1875 and 90 children in 1876 with six teachers, implying a pupil-teacher ratio of 15:1.

During the following years, the school flourished. It was endowed with a library in memory of a local doctor. In 1879, the school was renamed from "The Kurrachee European and Indo-European School" to "Karachi Grammar School".

During 1901, the school went through a difficult time after the headmaster, Mr Taylor, was forced into resignation by the school's managing committee; the number of students decreased considerably over the course of the following year. Taylor opened his own school named "Taylor High School". In 1902 Taylor returned along with the pupils from his private school. During the next three years, the school improved academically; however, it struggled financially, barely affording the employees. In 1910 the school received a grant of Rs. 2000, which continued over the next thirty years and rescued it from financial crisis.

In 1912, Bernard Tobin was the first pupil to take, and pass, the Cambridge School Certificate Examination. Additionally, this year marked the first scouts enrolled from the school. Towards the end of 1914, construction began on the third storey of the school, and students were temporarily taught in a building on Merewether Road, which was given free of cost. The total count of students had reached 151.

Academics and curriculum 
Karachi Grammar School gives its students 15 years of education on three different sites. The Kindergarten and Junior sections are accommodated in one site located in Clifton, with students spending Nursery, Prep, and Grades 1 and 2 in the Kindergarten Section, and Grades 3–6 in its Junior Section. Children spend three years in Grades 7–9 in the Middle School located on the Saddar site. On the senior level, the College Section, also located in Clifton, is geared towards preparing students for the GCE Ordinary Level, Advanced Subsidiary Level, and Advanced Level examinations.

Subjects taught at KGS include physics, chemistry, mathematics, biology, computer studies, computing, Pakistan studies, Urdu, Islamiyat, English Literature, English Language, economics, accounting, business studies, world history, art, world geography, psychology, sociology and media studies.

John Lennon controversy 
In 2017 the school had to drop plans for children to sing John Lennon's song Imagine in a concert after two prominent columnists objected to its "atheistic lyrics". The concert was held, and the song was replaced after the idea was condemned by many people including Orya Maqbool Jan and Ansar Abbasi. “The song questions our belief in God and encourages an atheist mindset,” Jan said on the nationally televised programme. He called for the government to take strict action against the school and its management. Moreover, “Students will sing John Lennon’s lyrics - no heaven, no hell, no religion too,” tweeted Ansar Abbasi on Wednesday. The provincial government of Sindh “must intervene,” he added, in remarks that were seized upon by conservative anchors on local television.

Extracurricular activities 
In the Junior Section, extra-curricular activities available include sports, music, swimming, a school choir, scouts and girl guides, community service, etc. In the Middle Section, activities and events are organized through clubs and societies, such as the Biology and Philosophy clubs, and the Helper's Society. At the College Section, there are several societies and clubs, such as those focused on humanities and arts, like the Eastern Music Society the Drama Council as well as those focused on STEM, notably being the Einstein Society and Mathematics Society, among others. Karachi Grammar School also hosts many national, inter-school competitions and events such as Karachi Grammar Science Olympiad, Karachi Grammar Mathematics Olympiad, KGX, Karachi Grammar Entrepreneurship Summit, Grammart, and Grammun.

Public speaking and debating 
The school has won national and international debate competitions. It maintains a Parliamentary Debate Team, several of whom have represented Pakistan in the World Schools Debating Championships.

Karachi Grammar School is also known for its Model United Nations team. It has entered competitions including LUMUN (Pakistan's largest international Model United Nations conference, hosting over 1200 delegates), where the school team won in 2008, 2009, 2012, 2015 and most recently, in 2019. Karachi Grammar School also took part in Harvard Model United Nations 2012 in Beijing, China, winning the 'Best Large Delegation' award. In August of the same year Karachi Grammar School sent a 12-member delegation to Hyderabad, India to attend the 2nd session of the Harvard Model United Nations India. Once more the delegation received the overall Best Large Delegation Award out of over 100 delegations and 800 delegates. This made the school the winner at both of Harvard's international high-school MUN conferences (China and India). In the following years, KGS was once again declared the Best Large Delegation at Harvard MUN India 2013 and Harvard MUN China 2014, 2015. They won Best International Delegation at HMUN Boston 2016, as well as HMUN China in 2017, sustaining an undefeated streak at international MUN conferences.

In 2018, the schools parliamentary debating team went to Turkey for the annual EurAsian Schools debating Championship and secured first place defeating the Greece national team in the finals. This was the first Pakistani team to ever win an international Parliamentary debating championship.

House system 
The four school houses are:
 Frere (for Sir Henry Bartle Frere, Bt., G.C.B.)Established: 1930Motto: Fortiter, Fideliter, Feliciter (Latin)Motto in English: Bravely, Faithfully, HappilyMascot: Phoenix (formerly Native American)
  Napier (for Gen. Sir Charles James Napier, G.C.B.)Established: 1930Motto: Universi Stamus (Latin)Motto in English: In Unity Lies StrengthMascot: Panther
   Papworth (for a former principal, Papworth, M.B.E.)Established: 1999Motto: Virtus Vincit Omnia (Latin)Motto in English: Virtue Conquers AllMascot: Shark
  Streeton (for the Rev. G. B. Streeton, M.A.)Established: 1930Motto: Excelsior (Latin)Motto in English: Ever Upwards Mascot: Dragon

The house system was introduced in 1929 and the houses were originally known as A, B and C; the following year the house names were changed to Napier, Frere and Streeton respectively.

Notable alumni

See also 
Aitchison College
La Martiniere Lucknow
Winchester College
The Lyceum School

References

External links 
 Karachi Grammar School website

Educational institutions established in 1847
Private schools in Pakistan
Schools in Karachi
Anglican schools in Pakistan
1847 establishments in British India